Martin Reim (born 14 May 1971) is an Estonian football manager and former professional player.

Reim played as a central midfielder for Lõvid, Sport Tallinn, Norma, Flora, KTP and the Estonia national team. He is Estonia's most capped player of all time with 157 appearances, and was the most capped European player from August 2007 until December 2009, when he was surpassed by Latvia's Vitālijs Astafjevs. Reim is also the most capped player never to have played in a major tournament.

Reim was named Estonian Footballer of the Year in 1995 and won the Estonian Silverball award three times, in 1995, 1997, and 1999. In 2011, he received the Order of the White Star for his services to Estonia.

In 2007, Reim opened a football academy (Martin Reimi Jalgpallikool). In 2016, the academy team Viimsi MRJK merged with Esiliiga B club HÜJK Emmaste, and became Viimsi JK.

Early life
Reim was born in Tartu and grew up in Tallinn. He graduated from the Tallinn Secondary School No. 49 in 1989, and from the Tallinn University of Technology in 2000.

Club career

Early career
Reim played for a local club Tallinna Lõvid (Lions of Tallinn), where he was coached by his father Olev Reim and Roman Ubakivi. In 1989, he joined Soviet Second League club Sport Tallinn. Reim returned to the Estonian league after a season and joined Norma. He was the top goalscorer in the 1990 season with 18 goals.

Flora
In 1992, Reim joined Meistriliiga club Flora, the successor of the Lõvid team. He won seven trophies with the club, including four Meistriliiga titles, in 1993–94, 1994–95, 1997–98 and 1998, two Estonian Cups, in 1994–95 and 1997–98, and an Estonian Supercup in 1998.

KTP
In June 1999, Reim joined Veikkausliiga club KTP on loan until the end of the season. The move was made permanent in December 1999, for a reported fee of 150,000 FIM (400,000 EEK).

Return to Flora
In 2001, Reim returned to Flora. During his second spell at Flora, he won three consecutive Meistriliiga titles, in 2001, 2002 and 2003, another Estonian Cup in 2008, and three more Estonian Supercups, in 2002, 2003 and 2004. On 5 December 2008, Reim announced his retirement from professional football. He holds the club record for the most appearances in the Meistriliiga, with 385.

International career
Reim made his international debut for Estonia on 3 June 1992, in a historic 1–1 draw against Slovenia in a friendly at Kadriorg Stadium. The match was Estonia's first official match since restoration of independence and Slovenia's first match ever. Reim scored his first international goal on 23 May 1994, in a 1–2 home loss to Wales in a friendly. He won the Estonian Silverball award for the best national team goal of the year three times, in 1995, 1997, 1999. On 2 June 2001, Reim made his 100th appearance for Estonia in a 2–4 home loss to the Netherlands in a qualification match for the 2002 FIFA World Cup. He ended his international career with a testimonial match on 6 June 2009, a 3–0 home win over Equatorial Guinea. With 157 appearances and 14 goals scored, he is Estonia's most capped player of all time.

Managerial career

Flora
On 3 December 2009, Flora announced that Reim would replace Tarmo Rüütli as the new manager of the club. He led Flora to victory in the 2010 season, ending the reign of Levadia who had won the four previous Meistriliiga titles. Flora successfully defended their title in 2011 season and won the 2010–11 Estonian Cup, defeating Narva Trans 2–0 in the final. On 14 October 2012, Reim resigned after poor results in the Meistriliiga, with Marko Lelov and Norbert Hurt taking over.

Estonia youth teams
In October 2012, Reim was named as manager of the Estonia under-18, under-21 and under-23 national sides. He led the under-21 team to win the 2014 Baltic Cup.

Estonia
On 14 September 2016, the Estonian Football Association appointed Reim as manager of the Estonia national team until the end of the qualification tournament for the 2018 FIFA World Cup. On 17 June, he and his coaching staff resigned from Estonia national team, six days after the 0–8 defeat to Germany in the UEFA Euro 2020 qualification.

Career statistics

International goals
Scores and results list Estonia's goal tally first, score column indicates score after each Reim goal.

Managerial statistics

See also 
 List of men's footballers with 100 or more international caps

References

External links

Martin Reimi Jalgpallikool 

1971 births
Living people
Sportspeople from Tartu
Estonian footballers
Soviet footballers
Estonian football managers
Association football midfielders
Esiliiga players
JK Tervis Pärnu players
Meistriliiga players
FC Norma Tallinn players
FC Flora players
Veikkausliiga players
Estonia international footballers
FIFA Century Club
FC Flora managers
Estonia national football team managers
Estonian expatriate footballers
Estonian expatriate sportspeople in Finland
Expatriate footballers in Finland
Recipients of the Order of the White Star, 5th Class
Kotkan Työväen Palloilijat players